Meadow High School or Meadow School is a 1A public high school located in Meadow, Texas (USA). It is part of the Meadow Independent School District located in northeast Terry County. In 2013, the school was rated "Met Standard" by the Texas Education Agency.

Athletics
The Meadow Broncos compete in the following sports:

Basketball
Cross Country
6-Man Football
Track and Field

State Titles
Girls Track 
1966(1A)
One Act Play 
1968(B), 1969(B), 1970(B), 1971(B), 1972(B), 1974(B), 1977(B)

State Finalists
Boys Basketball 
1957(B)

References

External links
Meadow ISD
List of Six-man football stadiums in Texas

Schools in Terry County, Texas
Public high schools in Texas
Public middle schools in Texas
Public elementary schools in Texas